The Valea Satului or Valea Coții is a left tributary of the river Olt in Romania. It flows into the Olt in Câinenii Mici.

References

Rivers of Romania
Rivers of Vâlcea County